Duksung Women's University is a private university in Seoul, South Korea founded in 1920.

History
Duksung Women's University is a four-year private women's university in South Korea. The campus is located in Dobong-gu, Seoul Metropolitan Government, and a lifelong graduate school and a corporation are located in Jongno-gu.
Duksung Women's University is the first female school founded by a female independence activist. In particular, Duksung Women's University stands out in early childhood education.
The English abbreviations of the university are Duksung, DSU, and DSWU.
Located around Deokseong Women's University on a transportation route, the subway station has the April 19th National Cemetery (Duksung Women's University) station on Seoul LRT Ui-Sinseol Line.

The school was established in 1920 as part of the drive for improved education, which arose out of the March 1st Movement. Its founder, Cha Mirisa (차미리사, 1880-1955), was an educator and leader of the Joseon Women's Education Society. At the time, it was known as the Geunhwa Academy. Because the name Geunhwa (근화, 槿花) refers to the Korean national flower, it was changed to "Duksung" under pressure from Japanese authorities in 1938.

Duksung was officially founded as a college, on the site of the Unhyeongung palace, in 1950. During this same year, Duksung Woman's Junior College was established along with the opening of a department of Korean literature and a department of domestic science. Dr Song Geum-seon took office as the first president of the school. It became a four-year college in 1952. In 1984, the main campus was moved to its present location in Dobong-gu. The college became a university in 1987.

Founder: Ms Cha Mirisa
1880(Gojong 17) - 1955, a feminist and educator.

Ms Cha Mirisa (1880-1955), who was a devout Roman Catholic, organized 'The Joseon Society for Women's Education' in 1920 to focus on providing educational opportunities to women in Korea. She began in a small chapel on April 19, 1920 teaching night classes to women. In October 1921, she established "Geunhwa Women's School" with the contributions collected from some lectures, assuming the office as a schoolmistress. She held lectures, musical concerts, plays, and bazaars to raise funds to maintain the school with no support from the Joseon Government-general or foreign missionaries.

In February 1934, she established a foundation named Geunhwa School, and was inaugurated as a chief director. She expanded the "Geunhwa Woman's School" into "Geunhwa Woman's Vocational School." After this, due to the insistence of the Japanese imperialists that Geunhwa represents Korea's national flower of an althea, the name of the school was changed to "Duksung School."

As the nation restored its independence in 1945, Mirisa established a higher educational institution for women, the Duksung Woman's Junior College (presently Duksung Woman's University). She was conferred posthumous honors as a Meritorious Person for National Independence (the Order of Merit for National Foundation, National Medal) in 2002, the year of the 57th anniversary of the restoration of national independence.

School history
 Establishment of the school and development against suppressions from the Japanese Imperialists (1920-1944) 
 1920: Establishment of Geunhwa School (presently, Duksung School) by Ms. Cha Mirisa.
 1938: Change the name of "Geunhwa" into "Duksung".
 1945: Reorganize Duksung Woman's Vocational School into Duksung Girls' Junior High and Senior High School.
Converted into an academic school (1945-1952) 
 1950: Establishment of Duksung Woman's Junior College. Opening a department of Korean literature a department of domestic science. Dr. Song Geum-seon took the office as the 1st president of the school.
 1951: Took Refuge in Busan, beginning a semester there.  
 1953: Return to the School in Seoul along as the government returned to the capital.

Growth and Rapid Progress (1953-1980)
 1955: Divided the school into a day college and a night college. Reorganize the day college into a department of Korean Literature, a department of English Literature, a department of Domestic Science, a department of Music, and a department of pharmacy. Newly establish a department of Korean Literature, a department of English Literature and a department of Domestic Science in the night college.  
 1956: Held the 1st commencement.
 1961: Established a graduate school. Established the master's courses in English and English Literature, Domestic Science and Pharmacy. Dr. Song Geum-sun took the office as a dean of the graduate school
 1980: Newly established a department of German language and literature, a department of Japanese language and literature, a department of history, a department of trade, a department of mathematics and a department of chemistry. Increase the graduation quota to 980 graduands.

1982 - 1999
 1982: Completion of the building of the Fine Art Department (2,471.5 pyeong) in Ssangmun-dong Campus. Relocation of the college of fine arts to SSangmun-dong Campus.  
 1984: Opening a continuing education center in Uni-dong Campus.
 1988: Abolition of the night college, established a department of Chinese language and literature, a department of philosophy and a department of statistics.  
 1996: Completion of a lecture building (1,639 pyeong), the building for the department of early childhood education (643 pyeong), a power plant (439 pyeong), the front stands of the campus playground (172 pyeong), a dormitory building (1,083 pyeong, extended).  
 1997: Dr. Kim Yong-rae took the office as the 4th president. Introduction and enforcement of the faculty system. Newly establish art history major, anthropology major, economics major, social works major and politics major. Changed the name of the department of library science into the department of library and information science. Reorganized the department of industrial art into an interior design major, a visual design major, and a dyeing and textile design major in the college of art.  
 1999: Got a university accreditation (the colleges and graduate schools) at the general university evaluation in the academic year of 1998.
 1999: Reorganized a college of humanity and social science (a division of Humanity and Social science, a department of early childhood education) into a college of liberal arts (a division of liberal arts, a division of language and literature, a department of English and English literature), a college of social science (a division of economics and commerce, a division of social science, a department of early childhood education). Rename major in clothing and textile into major in clothing and design, and major in dyeing and textile design into major in textile arts.

2002 - present
 2002: Ms. Cha Mirisa was selected as a Meritious Person for National Independence to be conferred posthumously the Order of Merit for National Foundation.
 2003: Dr. Shin Sangjeon took the office as the 6th president. Ranked in a 3rd place in total scores among the universities with the enrolled students below 8,000 at a national university evaluation carried out by Jungang Daily in 2003.
 2005: Completion of Chamirisa Memorial building, equipped with facilities in computer science, language, and liberal education (4,310 pyeong, four story above ground, one underground).
 2006: Inauguration of the former minister of the Ministry of Gender Equality, Eun-Hee Chi as the 7th president of the university.
 2006: Completion of DukSung Language Center that offers multi-media language education and humanity education (6,307.49 m2, six story above ground, one underground). Selected by University News Network as the winner of prize in educational innovation division for 2006.
 2007: Establishment of Human Resources Development Institute. Rewarded by Ministry of Education Science and Technology as Excellent in Education.
 2008: Selected as Best University in Early Childhood Education by Korean Educational Development Institute.
 2009: Ranked first place in faculty research and publications among women universities.
 2010: Construction of Duksung Hana Nuri Hall & Raon Center Celebration of the 90th commencement.
 2011: Ground breaking ceremony for construction of College of Pharmacy.

Academics
At the undergraduate level, courses of study are provided through five colleges: Humanities, Natural Science, Pharmacy, Social Science, and Art and Design.

Specialized graduate courses are also offered.

Undergraduate
 College of Humanities
 College of Social Sciences
 College of Natural Sciences
 College of Information and Media
 College of Pharmacy
 College of Art and Design

Graduates
Duksung University Graduate School was instituted in 1979. Male students enter the master's and doctorate programs. The master's and doctorate programs for university-research institute collaborative researches are in conjunction with the Korea Food & Drug Administration and Korea Food Research Institute.

The Graduate School was selected as an excellent university in the area of a graduate school, in the general university evaluation conducted by Korean Council for University Education.

Campus
The main campus is situated in Dobong-gu, a district of northern Seoul. It is close to both Bukhan Mountain and Dobong Mountain. The continuing education center is located at the former campus location, on the site of the Unhyeongung palace.

Ssangmundong Campus 
 Colleges, Graduate School
 33, Samyangro 144-gil, (419 Ssangmun Dong), Dobong Gu, Seoul 132-714, Korea
 Location : 300m toward the direction of Uyi-dong from Suyuri 4.19 tower

Uni-dong Campus 
 Graduate School of Education, Graduate School of FTB, School of Continuing Education, the corporate office 
 114, Uni-dong, Jongno-gu, Seoul, Korea
 Location : 300m toward the north from Tabgol Park in Jongno 2-ga(avenue)

Student life

Clubs and communities
 Archaeology Team - a field-investigation of historic places and studies on cultural heritage and traditions.
 Duk-Yeong-Hoe(DECAS) - English conversation practice.
 Current English Study Club - studies on international affairs and improvement of English skills.
 Byeori-Byeori - observation and studies on the celestial body.

Social Branch
 Korean History Study Group - studies on the contemporary history of Korea.
 Teo-Sa-Rang - voluntary service for rural community and studies on the life in rural communities.
 KUSA - voluntary social service for the lower income class of the society including after-school-curricular activities.
 Cham-U-Ri - voluntary social service for persons with a visual disability.
 Ho-U-Heo - voluntary social service for persons with a disability in rehabilitation facilities.

Religious Branch
 Duk-Bul-Hoe - studies on Buddhist thought, and its propagation.
 CAM (Christs Ambassador Mission) - Christianity propagation. 
 Deresa (Catholic Student Association) - Catholic propagation.
 CBA - Christianity propagation.
 CCC (Campus Crusade for Christ) - Christianity propagation.
 IVF (Inter-Varsity Christian Fellowship) - Christianity propagation.
 SFC (Student for Christ) - Christianity propagation.
 YWAM (Youth With A Mission) - Christianity propagation.
 JOY - Christianity propagation.

Life and Culture Branch
 Moon Light - to foster the appreciation of classical music.
 Baek-Wun - training of Korean traditional martial arts.
 Un-San (mountaineering club) - the cultivation of mind and body through climbing.
 HAM (amateur radio operator) -exchange with domestic and foreign members through radio communication. 
 Youth Hostel.

Performing Art Branch
 Sol-Ba-Ram - studies and spread of the people's song.
 Dod-Um - spread of a rhythmic movement of the people's song.
 Hana Puppet Show Club - for promotion of the university culture through puppet shows.
 Han-Dae-Nori - spread of the performances with Korean traditional farmer's musical instruments.
 CADEMU - studies the spread of popular songs.
 Unhyang Classical Guitar Club - learning classical guitar techniques.
 Unhyun Dramatic Art Study Group - promotion of the university culture through dramatic arts.
 Folk - Rock and Roll band.

Exhibition and Creation Branch
 Yeo-Reum - contribute to the cultural development of the university through cartoons.
 Unji Literary Club - learning the literature theories and creative activities. 
 Han-Bit - photograph works and exhibition. 
 Unhyeon Calligraphy - to foster calligraphy.
 Mi-Ye-tteul - studies on making a cross-stitch and teddy-bear.
 Ye-Wun -studies on pure arts and creative activities. 
 Location of club rooms: The 3rd floor of Student Hall.

Facilities

University Library
Located in the middle of the campus, the library has 1,589 seats, and holds over 460,000 oriental books, 90,000 western books and 6,848 types of periodicals and collected papers. The library has 100,000 pieces of media data, such as audio/video materials, slides and CD-ROM. Through the Digital Library System, data searching and viewing full texts of web databases are possible on the library web-site. Data which are not in the collection of the library are provided from libraries in Korea and abroad. The library is pursuing a joint list and cross-loan service with private universities in the northeastern part of Seoul.

Fitness Center
Located in the Hana Nuri Gymnasium, which was newly built in February 2010, the Fitness Center is equipped with treadmills, cycles, steppers, weight training equipment, and aerobic workout equipment. There is also a running track. To manage students' health, the Fitness Center offers individual exercise training program and body composition measuring service.

University Health Center
 Medical treatment by doctors 
 Emergency measures, emergency medication, transfer of the patient to hospital in emergency
 Counseling on health, obesity and quitting smoking
 Natural therapies, education on disease prevention, inoculations against diseases
 Operation of a recovery room
 Location : the 1st floor of Student Hall

School Cafeteria
Open hours:
 during semesters : Mon ~ Fri., 10:00 ~ 18:30
 during vacations : Mon. ~ Fri., 11:00 ~ 13:30
 Location : The 2nd floor of Student Hall

Dormitory
Single and double rooms are available in DWU's on-campus student residence. There is a lounge and kitchen per single unit occupied by 10 ~ 13 people. In the lounge and kitchen, a refrigerator, electric rice cooker, gas oven, dining table and cooking utensils are available to use. Other convenience facilities include a communal laundromat, TV room to watch TV and VTR, physical training room, reading room and Internet room for information search.

International Language Center
The International Language Center has a new building, dormitory facility, and research staff of master and doctorate degree professors majoring in English and Korean education, and foreign teaching faculty.

Facts
 History: founded in 1920 as Geun-Hwa School 
 Founder: Ms. Cha Mirisa (Melissa), who was a devout Roman Catholic
 Location: Seoul, Korea
 Ssangmun Campus: Main Office, Undergraduate Programs, Graduate School
 Jongro Campus: Corporate Office, Graduate School of Professional Studies, School of Adult and Continuing Education
 Enrolled students: 6,403
 Undergraduate program: 6,007
 Graduate program: 396
 Faculty members: 563
Tenured Professors: 181
 Emeritus, Visiting Professors: 48
 Part-timel lecturers: 334
 Staff members (including contract employees): 133
 Academic courses: 2,421

Notable alumni
Park Jung-soo, actress
Yeon Min-ji, singer
Choi Jin-ri, singer, actress, model and dancer

See also
List of colleges and universities in South Korea
Education in South Korea

External links
 Official university website
 Official university website

Universities and colleges in Seoul
Women's universities and colleges in South Korea
Educational institutions established in 1920
1920 establishments in Korea
Buildings and structures in Dobong District
Women in Seoul